Undateable is an American multi-camera television sitcom that premiered on May 29, 2014, as a mid-season replacement on NBC. The series was created by Adam Sztykiel and is based on the book Undateable: 311 Things Guys Do that Guarantee They Won't Be Dating or Having Sex by Ellen Rakieten and Anne Coyle. 

On May 13, 2016, NBC cancelled the series.

Series overview

Episodes

Season 1 (2014)

Season 2 (2015)

Season 3 (2015–16)

References

External links 
 
 

Lists of American LGBT-related television series episodes
Lists of American sitcom episodes